White Slippers is a 1924 British silent adventure film directed by Sinclair Hill and starring Matheson Lang, Joan Lockton and Gordon Hopkirk. It was based on a novel by Charles Edholm. It is set in Mexico and is known by the alternative title The Port of Lost Souls.

Cast
 Matheson Lang as Lionel Hazard 
 Joan Lockton as Alice  
 Gordon Hopkirk as Ramon Guitterez  
 Arthur McLaglen as Lorenzo  
 Nelson Ramsey as Hairy Joe 
 Irene Tripod as Dona Pilar  
 Jack McEwen as Mexican Rat  
 Adeline Hayden Coffin as Mother

References

Bibliography
 Low, Rachael. History of the British Film, 1918-1929. George Allen & Unwin, 1971.

External links

1924 films
1924 adventure films
British silent feature films
British adventure films
Films directed by Sinclair Hill
Films based on British novels
Stoll Pictures films
Films shot at Cricklewood Studios
British black-and-white films
1920s English-language films
1920s British films
Silent adventure films